Ibon Ajuria Gordón (born 9 August 1971) is a Spanish former professional racing cyclist.

He rode in the 1997 Vuelta a España, finishing 27th overall. He also finished 6th overall in the 1996 Tour de l'Avenir.

References

Spanish male cyclists
1971 births
Living people
People from Durangaldea
Sportspeople from Biscay
Cyclists from the Basque Country (autonomous community)